Kamiya (written: 神谷 lit. god valley or 上谷 lit. upper valley) is a Japanese surname. Notable people with the surname include:

, Japanese voice actor
, Japanese speed skater
, Japanese video game designer
, Japanese voice actor
, Japanese shogi player
, Japanese psychiatrist
, Japanese origami artist
, Japanese actress and model

Fictional characters
, protagonist of the manga series Rurouni Kenshin
Tai Kamiya, lead protagonist of Digimon

See also
Kamiya Station, a railway station in Fuji, Shizuoka Prefecture, Japan

Japanese-language surnames